Fort Parker State Park is a Texas state park near Mexia and to Limestone County seat Groesbeck, Texas. The city of Mexia and three local landowners donated the land creating the park in 1935. From 1935 to 1942, Civilian Conservation Corps Company 3807(C) built roads, recreational facilities, the concession building and a  dam of limestone, concrete, and soil across the Navasota River, creating Lake Fort Parker. The park was dedicated by former Texas Governor Pat Neff and opened to the public in May 1941. 
Fort Parker State Park has three hike-and-bike trails: Springfield trail (1.5-mile loop), Navasota River Trail (0.5 mile one way), and Baines Creek Trail (2.5 miles one way). The Bur Oak Trail (0.5-mile loop) is a nature trail with an interpretive guide pamphlet available.

Trees in the park include bur oak, water oak, blackjack oak, pecan, and eastern red cedar (juniper). Other plants that can be found are American beautyberry and sumac.

Inside the park is the Old Springfield Cemetery, all that remains of the once-thriving community of Springfield, Texas. Springfield was once the county seat of Limestone County and thrived during the 1840s and 1850s, but as men left for the Civil War, the town's businesses began to close. After the war,  racial conflict and lawlessness occurred. The railroad passed Springfield by for the towns of Mexia and Groesbeck, and the town of Springfield disappeared.

The Fort Parker Nature Center is open every weekend. Canoe, kayaks, and paddleboats are available for rental.  Day use, overnight camping, group barracks, an activity center, and a picnic pavilion are all available for rent.

Old Fort Parker
The CCC Company also rebuilt nearby Old Fort Parker, the site of the Fort Parker massacre, for the Texas Centennial observance in 1936. As an independent nonprofit, Old Fort Parker is not part of the state park.

Gallery

References

External links

 Park homepage
 Information at Stateparks.com 
Texas in Review - Fort Parker (1958), television film from the Texas Archive of the Moving Image

Texas state historic sites
Protected areas of Limestone County, Texas
State parks of Texas
Protected areas established in 1941
1941 establishments in Texas
Forts in Texas